Mikhail Zadornov may refer to:

 Mikhail Nikolayevich Zadornov (1948–2017), Russian stand-up comedian and writer
 Mikhail Mikhailovich Zadornov (b. 1963), Russian economist and politician